The Applied Physics Laboratory Ice Station 2007 (APLIS07) is a U.S. and Japanese laboratory dedicated to the study of global climate change.
It was first established in March 2011. It is owned and administered by the International Arctic Research Center at the University of Alaska Fairbanks.

In popular culture 

In 2007, APLIS was used for filming scenes in the movie Stargate: Continuum, in cooperation with the U.S. Navy submarine USS Alexandria (SSN-757).

External links 

International Arctic Research Center Official homepage

References

Meteorology research and field projects